This is a list of windmills in Ireland, split by the thirty-two counties that comprise the island.

Locations

Cork

Donegal

Down
See List of windmills in County Down

Dublin

Galway

Kerry

Kilkenny

Laois

Limerick

Derry

Longford

Louth

Meath

Monaghan

Offaly

Roscommon

Waterford

Wexford

Maps
1778 Taylor & Skinner's map of Louth
1836 Ordnance Survey
1830 Ordnance Survey

Notes

Mills in bold are still standing, known building dates are indicated in bold. Text in italics denotes indicates that the information is not confirmed, but is likely to be the case stated.

Sources

Unless stated otherwise, the sources for these entries are Windmill World, Eire mills and Windmill World, Northern Ireland mills

References

History of the Republic of Ireland
History of Northern Ireland
Ireland
Lists of buildings and structures in Ireland
Lists of buildings and structures in Northern Ireland